In September 1791, during the renewal of Ottoman structures in northern Serbia after the Austro-Turkish War (1788–91), Methodius was appointed the new Metropolitan of Belgrade after Dionysius had fled to Austria prior to the fall of Belgrade (Treaty of Sistova). Methodius was described as cleverful in church and political matters, and was obliged by the Patriarchate of Constantinople to cooperate with Hadji Mustafa Pasha, the Vizier of Belgrade. Apart from the Metropolitanate of Belgrade, he was given to manage almost all of the Eparchy of Vidin (which territory was under the governorship of Mustafa Pasha). Methodius was murdered on 26 January 1801, allegedly on Mustafa Pasha's orders. Archimandrite Hadži-Ruvim however claimed that he was drowned "due to his lawlessness and wrongdoings" having been a tyrant. Serbian historian Milenko Vukićević, most likely based on Lazar Batalaka (who did not cite a source), described him as a good-hearted elder, killed after his disciple Leontius falsely accused him of guilt to Mustafa Pasha. It was later proved that the Dahije (renegade Janissaries) had him killed, as was done with Mustafa Pasha soon afterwards. He was succeeded by Leontius.

References

Sources
 
 
 

Greeks from the Ottoman Empire
18th-century Greek people
18th-century Eastern Orthodox archbishops
1801 deaths
Metropolitans of Belgrade
Bishops of the Ecumenical Patriarchate of Constantinople
Greek murder victims
Murder victims from the Ottoman Empire